, official abbreviated name is . It is a for-profit private university in Sakyo-ku, Kyoto, Kyoto, Japan. It is a four-year college established in 1991, known as the Kyoto University of Art and Design (京都造形芸術大学, Kyōto zōkei geijutsu daigaku). The name of the university was changed to Kyoto University of the Arts in 2020.

Departments and Faculties

 Faculty of Art and Design
 Department of Fine and Applied Arts
 Department of Manga
 Department of Character Design
 Department of Information Design
 Department of Product Design
 Department of Spatial Design
 Department of Environmental Design
 Department of Film Production
 Department of Performing Arts
 Department of Creative Writing
 Department of Art Studies and Cultural Production
 Department of Art and Child Studies
 Department of Historical Heritage

References

External links
 Official website

Educational institutions established in 1934
Private universities and colleges in Japan
Kyoto University of the Arts
1934 establishments in Japan